Manas District is one of five districts of the province Cajatambo in Peru.

References